James Drescher (born August 12, 1965), better known as Jimmy G or Jimmy Gestapo and also known as Jimmy Spliff, is the lead singer for New York based hardcore punk band Murphy's Law.

Career
Murphy's Law is an American hardcore band from New York City, New York, formed in 1982. While vocalist Jimmy Gestapo remains the only remaining original member of the band. the line-up has consisted of former members of bands such as Skinnerbox, Danzig, The Bouncing Souls, Mucky Pup, Dog Eat Dog, Hanoi Rocks, Agnostic Front, Warzone, Cro-Mags, and D Generation.

Over the course of their career, Murphy's Law have released five full-length albums, the last of which was released in 2001. Countless singles and covers have been recorded throughout the band's career which are listed on their website. Murphy's Law have been touring Japan, Europe and the USA for years despite lack of record label support.

He appears in the video game Grand Theft Auto IV as the DJ of Liberty City Hardcore (L.C.H.C) radio station.

In 2018, he was hospitalized and underwent surgery to remove his gallbladder. The Mighty Mighty Bosstones, Sheer Terror, Killing Time held a concert to raise funds for his medical bills. There was also a GoFundMe campaign on his behalf.

References

External links
 Jimmy G's Myspace page

Living people
American male singers
1965 births
American punk rock singers
Place of birth missing (living people)